The Ambassador of Australia to Colombia is an officer of the Australian Department of Foreign Affairs and Trade and the head of the Embassy of the Commonwealth of Australia to the Republic of Colombia. The position has the rank and status of an Ambassador Extraordinary and Plenipotentiary and is based in the Australian Embassy in Bogota, which was opened by Foreign Minister Julie Bishop on 27 June 2017. The embassy replaced and consolidated an Austrade office and Consulate-General, as well as a separate Australian Federal Police Liaison Office, in Bogota. The present ambassador is the first resident incumbent of the office, currently Erika Thompson since 22 October 2020.

Posting history
Australia and Colombia established diplomatic relations on 9 September 1975 and the Ambassador to Peru, Allan Loomes, received non-resident accreditation for Colombia, presenting his credentials to President Alfonso López Michelsen in 1976. In 1983 accreditation for Colombia was transferred to the Australian Embassy in Caracas, Venezuela. When the Caracas embassy was closed in 2002, accreditation was then transferred to the resident ambassador in Santiago, Chile. In 1989, an Honorary Consulate was opened in Bogota. Prominent Colombian lawyer, Dario Cárdenas, of one of Colombia's largest law firms, Dentons Cardenas & Cardenas, served as Honorary Consul from July 1989 to 1994.

On 30 August 2011, Trade Minister and Acting Minister for Foreign Affairs Craig Emerson announced the opening of a new Austrade office and Australian Consulate-General (managed by Austrade) in Bogota: "This decision follows improvements in business conditions and increasing levels of foreign direct investment in response to the Colombian Government’s economic reform agenda". From July 2012 until the opening of the resident embassy in June 2017, the Trade Commissioner served concurrently as Consul-General.

In late 2016, Trade Minister Steven Ciobo visited Colombia and later announced to Colombian press with Foreign Minister Julie Bishop that Australia intended to open an Australian resident Embassy in Colombia as part of a greater Australian effort "to get closer to Latin America". On 10 March 2017, Bishop made the formal announcement of the intention to open a resident Embassy in Bogota, noting: "Colombia is the fourth largest economy in Latin America and enjoys the highest growth rate of the major economies in the region. Australia’s total trade with Colombia is worth $500 million annually and our investment in Colombia is valued at more than $3 billion." This was part of a planned $58 million expansion over four years of Australia's diplomatic presence abroad, being the fifth Australian embassy in Latin America and established alongside a new embassy to Morocco and a consulate-general in Surabaya. It was also reported that the increasing stability within Colombia due to the end of the civil war and its status as "South America's second strongest economy [with] an incredible demand for Australian goods and services" had prompted the embassy's creation. In response to the announcement, the Colombian press reported the Foreign Minister, María Ángela Holguín, as noting the importance of the embassy's opening to assisting the growing international student and education ties between the two countries.

On 27 June 2017, Foreign Minister Bishop officially opened the new Australian Embassy in Bogota and announced the appointment of the first resident ambassador the following day.

List of officeholders

Heads of mission

Consul-General and Trade Commissioner

See also
Foreign relations of Australia
Foreign relations of Colombia

References

External links
Australian Embassy Bogota, Colombia

 
Colombia
Australia